Lampichthys procerus, the Blackhead lanternfish, is a species of lanternfish found circumglobally in the southern oceans.  This fish grows to a length of  TL.

References
 

Myctophidae
Taxa named by Alec Fraser-Brunner
Monotypic marine fish genera